Adam Levy is a jazz guitarist who was a member of Norah Jones's band.

Career
Levy was born in Encino, California. Two of his uncles and one cousin played guitar, and his mother briefly took lessons. His grandfather, George Wyle, worked for The Andy Williams Show and The Flip Wilson Show on television as music director. As a teenager, Levy was a member of a local big band. After he graduated from high school, he studied at the Dick Grove School of Music, where his teachers included Ted Greene and Jimmy Wyble.

He moved to San Francisco in 1990 and worked as a studio musician, appearing on a Tracy Chapman album in the mid 1990s. At the end of the decade, he was a member of the group Killer Joey with drummer Joey Baron, guitarist  Steve Cardenas, and bassist Tony Scherr. Levy then moved to New York City, where he met Norah Jones and was a member of her band at the beginning of her career through her bestselling albums and world tours. He has also played with Rosanne Cash, Chris Difford, Amos Lee, and Lisa Loeb. He leads a trio called the Mint Imperials. He plays in a duo with session guitarist Rich Hinman. 

Since 2015, Levy has been the Chair of the Guitar Performance department at Los Angeles College of Music.

Discography

As leader
 Live at Avalaon & the Graves (Evander Music, 2000)
 Buttermilk Channel (Lost Wax Music, 2001)
 Get Your Glow On (Lost Wax, 2003)
 Loose Rhymes (Lost Wax, 2006)
 Washing Day (Lost Wax, 2007)
 The Heart Collector (Lost Wax, 2011)

As sideman
With Norah Jones
 Come Away with Me (Blue Note, 2002)
 Feels Like Home (Blue Note, 2004)
 Not Too Late  (Blue Note, 2006)

With others
 Noel Akchote, Gesualdo: Madrigals for Five Guitars (Blue Chopsticks, 2014)
 Nels Andrews, Off Track Betting (Ignatius, 2007)
 Rosanne Cash, She Remembers Everything (Blue Note, 2018)
 Tracy Chapman, New Beginning (Elektra 1995)
 Billie Davies, 12 Volt  (Cobra Basement, 2013)
 Trevor Dunn, Debutantes & Centipedes (Buzz 1998)
 Ana Egge, Road to My Love (Grace/Parkinsong, 2009)
 Gordian Knot, Gordian Knot (Avalon, 1998)
 Amos Lee, Amos Lee (Blue Note, 2005)
 Lisa Loeb, A Simple Trick to Happiness (Furious Rose, 2020)
 Mike Love, Reason for the Season (BMG, 2018)
 Sean Malone, Cortlandt (Free Electric Sound 2007)
 Anais Mitchell, Young Man in America (Wilderland, 2012)
 Meshell Ndegeocello, Ventriloquism (Naive, 2018)
 The O'Jays, The Last Word (S-Curve 2019)
 Mel Parsons, Glass Heart (Cape Road 2018)
 Amber Rubarth, A Common Case of Disappearing (Newsong, 2011)
 Jenny Scheinman, The Rabbi's Lover (Tzadik, 2002)
 Sex Mob, Din of Inequity (Columbia/Knitting Factory, 1998)
 Todd Sickafoose, Tiny Resistors (Cryptogramophone, 2008)
 Svoy, Automatons (P-Vine, 2009)
 Son of the Velvet Rat, Dorado (Fluff and Gravy, 2017)
 Leni Stern, Finally the Rain Has Come (Metalimbo, 2003)
 Allen Toussaint, American Tunes (Nonesuch, 2016)
 Noe Venable, The Summer Storm Journals (Petridish, 2007)
 Vulfpeck, The Beautiful Game (P-Vine, 2016)
 Rufus Wainwright, Unfollow the Rules (BMG, 2020)
 Chely Wright, I Am the Rain (Painted Red, 2016)

Bibliography
 Jazz Guitar Sight-Reading (Alfred Music, 1997)
 Play the Right Stuff – Creating Great Guitar Parts, (Alfred Music, 2006), DVD & online course
 50 Low Down Rhythms You Must Know, (Truefire, 2013), DVD & online course
 Rhythm Makeover with Adam Levy, (Truefire, 2014), DVD & online course
 Essentials: Slow Burn Soloing – Introduction (Truefire, 2015), DVD & online course
 Guitar Tips YouTube series

References

External links
 Official website

Living people
1966 births
Guitarists from California
American jazz guitarists
20th-century American guitarists
Jazz musicians from California
Trevor Dunn's Trio-Convulsant members